Azuébar is a municipality in the comarca of Alto Palancia, Castellón, Valencia, Spain.

The official web page of Azuébar: http://www.azuebar.es

Municipalities in the Province of Castellón
Alto Palancia